This is a list of military equipment used by Italy during the Second Italo-Ethiopian War.

Weapons 

 List of Second Italo-Ethiopian War weapons of Italy

Aircraft 

 List of Regia Aeronautica aircraft used in the Second Italo-Ethiopian War

References

Italy in the Second Italo-Ethiopian War
Italian, Second Italo-Ethiopian War
Military equipment of Italy
military equipment in the Second Italo-Ethiopian War